Kanakanavu can refer to:

 the Kanakanavu people
 the Kanakanavu language